The Journey of a Young Composer (translit. Akhalgazrda kompozitoris mogzauroba) is a 1985 Georgian comedy drama film directed by Giorgi Shengelaya. It was entered into the 36th Berlin International Film Festival where Shengelaya won the Silver Bear for Best Director.

Plot
The film is set in 1907. The film's protagonist, composer Nikusha (Levan Abashidze), travels to Georgian villages to collect folk songs. His companion is accidentally becomes Tatasheli Leko (Gia Peradze), who mistakes Nikusha for a revolutionary conspirator, and his map illustrating the villages for an insurrection plan.

Cast
 Gia Peradze as Leko Tatasheli
 Levan Abashidze as Nikusha Chachanidze
 Zura Kipshidze as Elizbar Tsereteli
 Rusudan Kvlividze as Tekla Tsereteli
 Ruslan Miqaberidze as Shalva Tsereteli
 Lili Ioseliani as Epemia Tsereteli
 Teimuraz Dzhaparidze as Giorgi Otskheli
 Ketevan Orakhelashvili as Gurandukhti
 Zinaida Kverenchkhiladze as Gulkani
 Chabua Amiredjibi as Davit Itrieli
 Teimuraz Bichiashvili as Rostomi

References

External links

1985 films
1985 comedy-drama films
Georgian-language films
Films directed by Giorgi Shengelaia
Soviet comedy-drama films
Comedy-drama films from Georgia (country)
Soviet-era films from Georgia (country)